Nürnberger may refer to:

Places near Nuremberg, Germany
 Nürnberger Land, a district in Bavaria, Germany
 Nürnberger Burg or Nuremberg Castle
 Nürnberger Reichswald, the location of Nuremberg Zoo

Other uses
 Albert Nürnberger (1854–1931), German bow maker
 M. J. Nurenberger (1911–2001), Jewish journalist, author and publisher
 Nürnberger Nachrichten (NN), a local daily in the Nuremberg-Erlangen-Fürth area

See also
 Nürnberg (disambiguation)